Angelo Domenghini (born 25 August 1941) is an Italian football manager, and former footballer, who played as a forward, often as a right winger, or even as a striker. Despite his creative role, he also had a notable eye for goal, as well as excellent technical ability, which, along with his acceleration and agility, allowed to beat players with the ball, in particular during one on one situations. He represented Italy in their victorious UEFA Euro 1968 campaign, as well as at the 1970 FIFA World Cup, where they finished in second place, playing in the finals of both tournaments.

As a manager, he coached several clubs, including Derthona on several occasions, and Torres, at the beginning of the 1983–84 season.

Club career

Born in Lallio, province of Bergamo, he began his professional career with his local club Atalanta in 1960, winning the Coppa Italia in 1963, and finishing the tournament as the top goalscorer with 5 goals, also scoring a hat-trick in the final against Torino. He then moved to Internazionale in 1964, and was a member of manager Helenio Herrera's highly successful "Grande Inter" squad; he played 164 times for the club, scoring 54 goals, winning two Serie A titles, two Intercontinental Cups, and a European Cup.

He also later played for Cagliari, forming a notable attacking trio alongside Gigi Riva and Sergio "Bobo" Gori, as they went on to win the Serie A title during the 1969–70 season, Domenghini's first season with the club. He later played with A.S. Roma for the 1973–74 season, subsequently moving Serie B side Verona in 1974, for two seasons, helping them gain promotion to Serie A in 1975. He then played one more final season in Serie A with Foggia, before playing in the Serie C lower divisions, with Olbia for one season, and subsequently for Trento for a single Serie C1 season, before retiring in 1979. In total, he made 390 appearances in Serie A, scoring 98 goals.

International career

Domenghini was capped on 33 occasions for Italy, scoring 8 goals for his country between 1963 and 1972. He represented Italy at UEFA Euro 1968 on home soil, and in the European Championship final, he notably scored the equaliser in the 80th minute against Yugoslavia from a powerful free-kick, after Italy had been trailing 1–0; this was Italy's first goal in a European Championship. Italy then went on to win the replay 2–0, which allowed them to win their first ever European Championship title; Domenghini was later named to the Team of the Tournament for his performances.

He later went on to take part in the 1970 FIFA World Cup with Italy, scoring a goal in Italy's opening 1–0 win over Sweden in the group stage, helping them to move on to the knockout round. Italy would eventually reach the final, only to lose 4–1 to Brazil.

Honours

Club
Atalanta
Coppa Italia: 1962–63

Inter
Serie A: 1964–65, 1965–66
European Cup: 1964–65
Intercontinental Cup: 1964, 1965

Cagliari
Serie A: 1969–70

International
Italy
UEFA European Championship: 1968
FIFA World Cup: 1970 (runners-up)

Individual
Coppa Italia Top Goal-scorer: 1962–63
UEFA European Championship Team of the Tournament: 1968

References

External links
Official site

1941 births
Living people
Sportspeople from the Province of Bergamo
Italian footballers
Italy international footballers
Italy under-21 international footballers
Serie A players
Serie B players
Serie C players
Atalanta B.C. players
Inter Milan players
Cagliari Calcio players
A.S. Roma players
Hellas Verona F.C. players
Calcio Foggia 1920 players
Olbia Calcio 1905 players
UEFA Euro 1968 players
UEFA European Championship-winning players
1970 FIFA World Cup players
Italian football managers
A.S.D. HSL Derthona managers
Association football forwards
Association football wingers
Footballers from Lombardy